Liu Yong (born 12 August 1975) is a former international level badminton player for China who specialized in mixed doubles.

He is married to former singles player on the Chinese national badminton team Dai Yun.

Career 
Liu Yong started badminton training when he was 8, and was taken into the Chinese National Team in 1993. He won numerous international titles in mixed doubles, the majority of them with Ge Fei. He won men's doubles at the 2002 Malaysia Open with Chen Qiqiu. In 2004, he joined the Unisys in Japan as a player and coach for the team.

World Championships 
Liu won the 1997 IBF World Championships in mixed doubles, with Ge Fei, beating Jens Eriksen and Marlene Thomsen in the final. They also won a bronze medal at the 1999 IBF World Championships. In the next edition in 2001, Liu reached the mixed doubles quarterfinals with Cheng Jiao but lost to Michael Søgaard and Rikke Olsen.

Summer Olympics 
Liu Yong competed in badminton at the 2000 Summer Olympics in mixed doubles with Ge Fei. In the first round they had a bye, and in the second round they were defeated by Chris Bruil and Erica van den Heuvel, from the Netherlands.

Achievements

World Championships 
Mixed doubles

World Cup 
Mixed doubles

Asian Games 
Men's doubles

Asian Championships 
Mixed doubles

Asian Cup 
Men's doubles

Mixed doubles

World Junior Championships 
Boys' doubles

IBF World Grand Prix 
The World Badminton Grand Prix sanctioned by International Badminton Federation (IBF) since 1983.

Men's doubles

Mixed doubles

References

External links 
 

1975 births
Living people
Sportspeople from Nanjing
Badminton players from Jiangsu
Chinese male badminton players
Badminton players at the 2000 Summer Olympics
Olympic badminton players of China
Badminton players at the 1998 Asian Games
Badminton players at the 2002 Asian Games
Asian Games silver medalists for China
Asian Games bronze medalists for China
Asian Games medalists in badminton
Medalists at the 1998 Asian Games
Medalists at the 2002 Asian Games
World No. 1 badminton players
Chinese badminton coaches